Ahmad Jan is the name of:
 Ehmetjan Qasim (1914–1949), Uyghur Soviet communist puppet leader of Second East Turkestan Republic
 Nur Ahmad Jan Bughra (died 1934), Uyghur Emir of the First East Turkestan Republic
 Ahmad Jan (Bagram detainee) (born 1948), named on the first official list of Bagram detainees
 Maulvi Ahmad Jan (Taliban governor) (died 2013), former governor of Zabol Province